The Diliad,  or Deiliad ( "cowardice", a pun on the Iliad), is a lost parody of the Iliad mentioned in Aristotle’s Poetics where it is attributed to Nicochares.

References 

Ancient Greek comedies
Lost poems
Parodies of literature
Poetry based on the Iliad